Pinot is a surname. Notable people with the surname include:

Giuseppe Pinot-Gallizio (1902–1964), Italian painter
Manohara Odelia Pinot (born 1992), Indonesian model
Robert Pinot (1862–1926), long-term secretary-general of the Comité des Forges de France
Thibaut Pinot (born 1990), French cyclist